The Genetics and Molecular Research Journal is a peer-reviewed open-access scientific journal in the fields of biology and medicine, edited and published monthly in the fields of genetics, molecular biology, proteomics, genomics and evolution. The journal was listed on Beall's list before it was taken down. A hijacked journal was also setup at geneticsmr.org by the Pulsus Group, unlike the legitimate geneticsmr.com operated by FUNEPC-RP.

According to the Journal Citation Reports, the journal has a 2016 impact factor of 0.765.

History 
The journal was established in 2002 by Francisco A. Moura Duarte and its honorary editor is Pedro Henrique Saldanha.

Abstracting and indexing 
The journal is abstracted and indexed in:

References

External links 
 

General medical journals
Biology journals
Academic journals published by learned and professional societies of Brazil